John H. Hinrichs (July 10, 1904 – February 13, 1990) was a United States Army lieutenant general who served as the 20th Chief of Ordnance for the United States Army Ordnance Corps.

Early life

John Honeycutt Hinrichs was born at Sandy Hook Proving Ground in Sandy Hook, New Jersey on July 10, 1904 to Frederic William Hinrichs, Jr and Mary Honeycutt-Hinrichs. He was raised in California. His father and grandfather, John Thomas Honeycutt, were both graduates of the United States Military Academy, West Point, New York. His brother, Lieutenant Frederic W. Hinrichs, III, was a pilot in the United States Navy Reserve and died in an airplane crash during World War II.

In 1928 Hinrichs graduated from the United States Military Academy.

Early career
Hinrichs was initially assigned to the Field Artillery branch. In 1932 he received a Bachelor of Science degree in mechanical engineering from the Massachusetts Institute of Technology. In 1935 he transferred from Artillery to the Ordnance Corps and, in 1937, graduated from the Army Industrial College. Hinrichs served in numerous Ordnance assignments in the United States and overseas, including a posting to Frankford Arsenal and command of the Twin Cities Ordnance Plant.

World War II
From 1943 to 1945 Hinrichs was executive officer (second in command) of the Maintenance Division in the Ordnance Department's Field Service Office. In this position he was responsible for improving equipment and weapons readiness by analyzing data to identify systemic causes for breakdowns and repairs, and developing solutions to minimize the time these items were non-mission capable.

Later career
In the late 1940s Hinrichs served as Ordnance Officer for United States Army Forces, Middle Pacific. In 1948 he graduated from the National War College.

From the early to mid-1950s Hinrichs was head of the Field Service Division. He was Deputy Chief of Ordnance from 1955 to 1958. From 1958 until his retirement in 1962, Hinrichs was the Army's Chief of Ordnance. He was promoted to lieutenant general in 1959.

Awards and decorations
Hinrichs' decorations included the Army Distinguished Service Medal for service from September 1955 to May 1962, Legion of Merit for service from 1943 to 1945 and the Bronze Star Medal.

In 1978, Hinrichs was inducted in the Ordnance Corps Association's Hall of Fame.

Retirement and death
In 1962, Hinrichs had been announced as the first head of a new Supply and Maintenance Command. In April, 1962 he gave Congressional testimony defending Nike Zeus Missile contractors against charges of excessive profiteering on previous projects. As a result of the controversy over whether the contractors were being overpaid, and because he opposed the reorganization, Hinrichs opted to retire.

Hinrichs died in Carmel, California on February 13, 1990.

References

1904 births
1990 deaths
United States Army generals
United States Military Academy alumni
MIT School of Engineering alumni
National War College alumni
United States Army personnel of World War II
Recipients of the Distinguished Service Medal (US Army)
Recipients of the Legion of Merit
People from Carmel-by-the-Sea, California
Military personnel from California